The UAE National Basketball League is the top professional basketball league in the United Arab Emirates.

The league was founded in 2013 and features 10 teams. The most decorated team in the league is Shabab Al Ahli who have won eight of the nine championships thus far.

Current clubs

League Championship

References

External links
UAE basketball at Asia-Basket.com

Videos
UAE Basketball 2014 Winner Al Ahli Club Dubai Youtube.com video
Basketball Tournoi Amical de Dubai CA vs Al Ahly 1ère mi tp 2015 2016 Youtube.com video 

Basketball in the United Arab Emirates
Basketball leagues in Asia
Basketball